Siccia butvilai is a moth in the subfamily Arctiinae. It was described by Povilas Ivinskis and Aidas Saldaitis in 2008. It is found in Socotra, Yemen.

References

Moths described in 2008
Nudariina